Pawel B. Szajda (born January 13, 1982) is an American screen and stage actor. He is best known for his roles in Under the Tuscan Sun, Generation Kill, Tatarak, and as Soviet cosmonaut Alexei Poletov in the third season of the Apple TV+ original science fiction space drama series For All Mankind.

Early life and education 
Szajda was born and raised in Farmington, Connecticut.

Szajda's maternal great-grandfather left Poland for Chicago in 1912, two years prior to the outbreak of World War I. He married Szajda's Polish grandmother, had children, and, after the war ended, moved to Poland. In 1964, the family moved back to the United States, which is where Szajda's mother graduated from college and then returned with the family to Poland. In Poland, she met Szajda's father, and they had Szajda's older sister, Barbara, and two older brothers, Marcin and Adam. Following the introduction of martial law in Poland in 1981, Szajda's family relocated to the United States. Szajda also has a younger brother, Phil.

Growing up in the United States, his family spoke Polish and sent Pawel and his siblings to Polish-language school every Saturday. "I thought my parents' decision to send me to Polish-language classes every Saturday ruined my childhood, but it's actually been my stepping stone into acting," Szajda said. He was a Polish Boy Scout.

Szajda graduated from Farmington High School in 1999. During his time at the school he participated in track and field, was a state champion wrestler, played trumpet and was the marching band drum major. He also played the title role in the play The Foreigner by Larry Shue.

Career 
Szajda's acting career started with a commercial for the 1996 Olympics.

In 2002, he won a role in Under the Tuscan Sun. Director Audrey Wells had wanted to use an actor from Poland, but due to visa issues, she was forced to look elsewhere and chose Szajda. Szajda plays a Polish immigrant handyman named Pawel, disapproved of by his Italian girlfriend's father.

After filming completed on Under the Tuscan Sun, Szajda returned from Italy to finish his studies in English literature and economics. He spent a year at Bridgewater State College before moving to New York City to attend Fordham University at the Lincoln Center campus.

He continued to act on screen and on stage while pursuing his education. He appeared in an episode of Hope and Faith (2004), Venom (2005), The Infliction of Cruelty (2006), and Death Without Consent (2007).

Szajda appeared in the 2008 HBO mini-series Generation Kill (2008) as Corporal Walt Hasser.

In the 2009 movie, Tatarak (Sweet Rush in English) by Academy Award winner Andrzej Wajda, Szajda made his Polish film debut in the leading role of Boguś. The film was a competitor in the 59th Berlin International Film Festival.

He has played in The Players Theater in New York City and Makor/Steinhardt Center at the 14th Street Y in Manhattan.

In 2022, Szajda had a recurring role in the third season of the Apple TV+ original science fiction space drama series For All Mankind as Soviet cosmonaut Alexei Poletov, a member of Roscosmos' Mars-94 mission and one of the first humans to land on Mars.

He is represented by The Glick Agency.

Personal life 
Szajda's interests include traveling, photography, drawing, and playing the trumpet. "When we were filming Tatarak in Grudziądz, I took some wonderful photos of the sky—it’s amazing there! Maybe that’s why I’d like to act more in Poland—to be able to visit the country."

Filmography 
1996: Furby Commercial
1996: Pablow, An Olympic commercial in the United States
2003: Under the Tuscan Sun - Pawel
2004: Hope and Faith (TV Series) - College Guy
2005: Venom - Ricky
2007: Death Without Consent - Sean
2008: Generation Kill (TV Mini-Series) - Cpl. Walt Hasser
2009: Tatarak (Sweet Rush [English title]) - Bogus / Marta's lover
2011: Blue Bloods (TV Series) - Sergei Sokoloff
2011: Wygrany (The Winner) - Oliver Linovsky
2012: 3 Days of Normal - Trent Callender
2015: Agent Carter (Episode: "Snafu") - Ovechkin
2016: Our Kind of Traitor - Blue Eyed Killer
2016: Imperium - Vince Sargent
2018: Dynasty (Episode: "Twenty-Three Skidoo") - Nikolai Dimitrov
2019: The Haunting of Sharon Tate - Wojciech Frykowski
2019: Above the Shadows - Marjus
2022: For All Mankind (TV series) - Alexei Poletov

Stage work 
1990s: Charlie Baker, The Foreigner by Larry Shue, at Farmington High School
2006: The Infliction of Cruelty by Sean McManus and Andrew Unterberg at the 10th Annual New York International Fringe Festival, August 18–26

References

External links 
 

American male film actors
1982 births
Living people
Male actors from Connecticut
People from Farmington, Connecticut
Bridgewater State University alumni
Fordham University alumni
American people of Polish descent
20th-century American male actors
American male stage actors
American male television actors
21st-century American male actors